Bruu (also spelled Bru, B'ru, Baru, Brou) is a Mon–Khmer dialect continuum spoken by the Bru people of mainland Southeast Asia.

Sô and Khua are dialects.

Names
There are various local and dialect designations for Bru (Sidwell 2005:11).

So ~ Sô
Tri (So Tri, Chali)
Van Kieu
Leu ~ Leung (Kaleu)
Galler
Khua
Katang (not the same as Kataang)

Distribution
The distribution of the Bru language spreads north and northeast from Salavan, Laos, through Savannakhet, Khammouane, and Bolikhamsai, and over into neighboring Thailand and Vietnam (Sidwell 2005:11). In Vietnam, Brâu (Braò) is spoken in Đắk Mế, Bờ Y commune, Đắk Tô District, Kon Tum Province.

Dialects
Thailand has the following Western Bru dialects (Choo, et al. 2012).
Bru Khok Sa-at of Phang Khon District and Phanna Nikhom District, Sakon Nakhon Province
Bru Woen Buek of Woen Buek (Wyn Buek), Ubon Ratchathani Province (more similar to Katang)
Bru Dong Luang of Dong Luang District, Mukdahan Province

The following Bru subgroups are found in Quảng Bình Province (Phan 1998).
Vân Kiêu: 5,500 persons in Lệ Thủy District and Vĩnh Linh District (in Quảng Trị Province)
Măng Coong: 600 persons in Bố Trạch District
Tri: 300 persons in Bố Trạch District
Khùa: 1,000 persons in Tuyên Hóa District

Below is a comparative vocabulary of Vân Kiêu, Măng Coong, Tri, and Khùa from Phan (1998:479-480), with words transcribed in Vietnamese orthography.

Phonology

Consonants 
The consonant sounds in both East and West dialects consist of the following:

  is typically pronounced as labiodental fricative  or approximant  when occurring in initial position.
  can be heard as either a trill  or a tap .
  can also be heard as a voiced glottal  when a preceding a breathy vowel sound in the Western Bru dialects. It can also be heard as nasal  when preceding a nasal vowel in the Western dialects.

 Plosive sounds  in final position are heard as unreleased .

Vowels

Breathy vowels 
Vowel sounds may also be distinguished using breathy voice:

Nasal vowels 
Nasal vowel sounds may occur in the Western Bru dialect:

References

External links
UCLA phonetics lab data
http://projekt.ht.lu.se/rwaai RWAAI (Repository and Workspace for Austroasiatic Intangible Heritage)
http://hdl.handle.net/10050/00-0000-0000-0003-AD64-5@view Bru in RWAAI Digital Archive

Further reading
Choo, Marcus, Jennifer Herington, Amy Ryan and Jennifer Simmons. 2012. Sociolinguistic Survey Of Bru In Phang Khon And Phanna Nikhom Districts, Sakon Nakhon Province, Thailand. Chiang Mai: Linguistics Institute, Payap University.
Choo, Marcus. 2012. An investigation of intelligibility between So varieties in Northeast Thailand: the Bru in Khok Saat. Chiang Mai: Payap University.
Choo, Marcus. 2008. Sociolinguistic survey of So in Northeastern Thailand. Chiang Mai: Payap University.
Khồng Diễn (1975). "Về nhóm người Khùa (Bru) ở Quảng Bình". In, Ủy ban khoa học xã hội Việt Nam: Viện dân tộc học. Về vấn đề xác định thành phần các dân tộc thiểu số ở miền bắc Việt Nam, 538–548. Hà Nội: Nhà xuất bản khoa học xã hội.
Migliazza, Brian. 2002. Multilingualism Among the So People of Issan.
Phạm Đức Dương (1975). "Về mối quan hệ cộng đồng tộc người giữa các ngôn ngữ thuộc nhóm Việt - Mường miền tây tỉnh Quảng Bình". In, Ủy ban khoa học xã hội Việt Nam: Viện dân tộc học. Về vấn đề xác định thánh phần các dân tộc thiểu số ở miền bắc Việt Nam, 500–517. Hà Nội: Nhà xuất bản khoa học xã hội.
Phan Hữu Dật (1975). "Về tên gọi các tộc người nói ngôn ngữ Môn - Miên ở miền tây tỉnh Quảng Bình". In, Ủy ban khoa học xã hội Việt Nam: Viện dân tộc học. Về vấn đề xác định thánh phần các dân tộc thiểu số ở miền bắc Việt Nam, 531–537. Hà Nội: Nhà xuất bản khoa học xã hội.
Sidwell, Paul. (2005). [The Katuic languages: classification, reconstruction and comparative lexicon]. LINCOM studies in Asian linguistics, 58. Muenchen: Lincom Europa. 

Katuic languages
Languages of Laos
Languages of Thailand
Languages of Vietnam